Kristof Vliegen chose to not defend his 2008 title.
Dominik Meffert won in the final 6–3, 6–1, against Benjamin Balleret.

Seeds

Draw

Final four

Top half

Bottom half

References
 Main Draw
 Qualifying Draw

IPP Trophy - Singles
Geneva Open Challenger